Csaba Szakos (born 3 July 1975 in Miskolc) is a Hungarian football player who has playsed for BVSC Budapest and Diósgyőri VTK.

References 

1975 births
Living people
Hungarian footballers
Budapesti VSC footballers
Association football defenders
Sportspeople from Miskolc